Kathryn L. Afzali (born May 27, 1957) is an American politician who represented district 4 in the Maryland House of Delegates from 2011 to 2019.

Background
Afzali was born and raised in the San Francisco Bay area. She is a graduate of Mount St. Mary's University. She was a columnist for the Frederick News-Post from 2003 to 2006.

Career
Afzali was sworn in as a member of the Maryland House of Delegates on January 12, 2011. She was assigned to the House Ways and Means Committee and to its Election Law and Education subcommittees. She served as the Ranking Republican on Ways and Means. She is also a member of the Women Legislators of Maryland.

By the end of Afzali's first legislative session in Annapolis, she sponsored or co-sponsored forty-nine bills.

2012 Congressional election

Governor Martin O'Malley proposed, and Maryland General Assembly adopted, a redistricting plan that reconfigured Republican incumbent U.S. Congressman Roscoe Bartlett's 6th congressional district to one that Barack Obama won in the 2008 United States presidential election. The previous version of the district had President Obama at 40%, while the newly redrawn district had President Obama at 56%.

On January 11, 2012, believing that Bartlett would be retiring, Afzali announced her intention to run for the GOP nomination to represent Maryland's 6th congressional district. Bartlett eventually decided to run for reelection. He won the primary election with 44% of the vote in a crowded field but went on to lose the general election.

2018 Frederick County Executive election

Afzali won the Republican primary on June 26, 2018 with 42.7 percent of the vote. She was defeated by incumbent Democratic County Executive Jan Gardner in the general election, receiving 43.1 percent of the vote to Gardner's 52.1 percent. After her loss, Afzali stepped down from the Frederick County Republican Central Committee.

Personal life 
Afzali is a member of the Grace Community Church of Frederick. She is a Life Member of the National Rifle Association.

Political positions

Agriculture
Her first successful piece of legislation was a honey standard which passed unanimously through both chambers and has been used as a model in other states.

She introduced a Farm Estate Tax bill that eliminated state inheritance taxes for family farms.

Crime
Afzali has sponsored legislation to increase sanctions on drunk drivers with multiple offenses, and was responsible for "Anayah's Law", which allows Child Protective Services to be relieved of its obligation to reunite children with their parent if the parent has committed "severe physical abuse" against the child.

In her second year, she pushed for legislation to require a photo ID when voting in the state of Maryland.

In 2013, she co-sponsored legislation that would make cyber-bullying a child a misdemeanor.

During the 2018 legislative session, Afzali introduced legislation to ban telemarketers and others from falsifying the origin of their calls and establish a penalty for providing false location information.

National politics
Afzali endorsed Mitt Romney for president on September 8, 2011. Afzali endorsed Ted Cruz for president on April 21, 2016.

Paid sick leave
In 2018, Afzali voted to sustain Governor Larry Hogan's veto on a bill to required employers with 15 or more employees to provide earned sick leave.

Taxes
In 2018, Afzali testified in support of legislation to extend tax credits to police officers in high-crime neighborhoods to transit police.

During her county executive campaign, Afzali said that she would freeze property taxes in her first 100 days. She also said that she supported "slower growth" with less high-density development to keep the county from having to raise taxes.

Electoral history

References

External links
Official web site
Maryland State web site

Republican Party members of the Maryland House of Delegates
1957 births
Living people
Mount St. Mary's University alumni
American women in business
American women journalists
Women state legislators in Maryland
People from Middletown, Maryland
21st-century American politicians
American United Methodists
21st-century American women politicians